Donald Froggett (1929 – 12 February 2011) was an English professional rugby league footballer who played in the 1940s and 1950s.

Background
Don Froggett was born in Wakefield, West Riding of Yorkshire, England, and he died aged 81 in Wakefield, West Yorkshire, England.

Playing career

International honours
Don Froggett won a cap for England while at Wakefield Trinity in the 7-5 victory over France at Odsal Stadium, Bradford on Saturday 7 November 1953.

County Honours
Don Froggett was selected for Yorkshire County XIII while at Wakefield Trinity during the 1953/54, 1954/55, 1955/56 and 1956/57 seasons.

County Cup Final appearances
Don Froggett played left-, i.e. number 4, in Wakefield Trinity's 17-3 victory over Keighley in the 1951 Yorkshire County Cup Final during the 1951–52 season at Fartown Ground, Huddersfield on Saturday 27 October 1951.

Club career
Don Froggett appears to have scored no drop-goals (or field-goals as they are currently known in Australasia), but prior to the 1974–75 season all goals, whether; conversions, penalties, or drop-goals, scored 2-points, consequently prior to this date drop-goals were often not explicitly documented, therefore '0' drop-goals may indicate drop-goals not recorded, rather than no drop-goals scored. In addition, prior to the 1949–50 season, the archaic field-goal was also still a valid means of scoring points.

Testimonial match
Don Froggett's Testimonial match at Wakefield Trinity took place against Huddersfield on Saturday 31 January 1959.

References

External links
Trinity’s former Yorkshire and England centre, Don Froggett, has died at the age of 81
Obituary - Wakefield Express

1929 births
2011 deaths
England national rugby league team players
English rugby league players
Rugby league players from Wakefield
Rugby league centres
Wakefield Trinity captains
Wakefield Trinity players
Yorkshire rugby league team players